Dante Benvenuti (10 July 1925 – 19 March 2012) was an Argentine cyclist. He competed in the individual and team road race events at the 1948 Summer Olympics.

References

External links
 

1925 births
2012 deaths
Argentine male cyclists
Olympic cyclists of Argentina
Cyclists at the 1948 Summer Olympics
Cyclists from Buenos Aires